"The Implant" is the 59th episode of the sitcom Seinfeld. It is the 19th episode of the fourth season, and first aired on February 25, 1993 on NBC. The title refers to Elaine's belief that Jerry's girlfriend has breast implants, which is shaken when she accidentally grabs her breasts in a sauna incident. In a secondary plotline, George goes to a funeral for his girlfriend's aunt in hopes that it will advance their relationship.

Plot
Jerry dumps his girlfriend, Sidra, after Elaine convinces him that her breasts are probably the result of implants. Kramer claims a man at the health club who introduces himself as "Sal Bass" is actually author Salman Rushdie. Later, Elaine and Sidra are in a sauna together, and Elaine accidentally grabs onto Sidra's breasts to break her fall after tripping. Elaine goes to Jerry and admits that she now thinks that Sidra's breasts are real and "are spectacular". Jerry decides to take Sidra back. Elaine later carelessly enters Jerry's apartment when Sidra is there, cluing in Sidra that the two of them are friends. Sidra dumps Jerry, thinking that he had Elaine deliberately feel her breasts in the sauna. Sidra tells Jerry as she leaves, "...And, by the way, they're real, and they're spectacular! ..."

George accompanies his girlfriend, Betsy, to Detroit for her aunt's wake, hoping to accelerate their relationship by being supportive in the midst of her grief. He tries to get a copy of the death certificate of the aunt while he is there, so that he can get a 50% bereavement discount on the airfare. George gets into an argument at the funeral reception with Betsy's brother, Timmy, over the social acceptability of double-dipping a chip. It devolves into a disruptive fistfight, leading an upset Betsy to break up with him. George was not able to get a copy of the death certificate. George shows to an airline clerk a picture of him next to the casket, but the clerk does not consider this to be sufficient proof.

Production
During the taping, Larry David asked Teri Hatcher to add the line "And, by the way, they're real, and they're spectacular.", which was not in the script.

Reception
The television show MythBusters tested the theory that double dipping was like "putting your whole mouth right in the dip" on the April 22, 2009 episode. The MythBusters found that double-dipping produced fewer microbes than putting all the dip in your mouth. Also, the number of microbes present was negligible compared to the amount found in a regular dip.

In Salman Rushdie's non-fiction book Joseph Anton: A Memoir, Rushdie recounts bumping into Jerry Seinfeld at a cocktail party where Seinfeld nervously asked his opinion of "The Implant" and "visibly relaxed" upon Rushdie's telling him "that he had thought the episode very funny."

References

External links

Seinfeld (season 4) episodes
1993 American television episodes
Cultural depictions of Salman Rushdie